The  is a group of Japanese dialects spoken in central San'in. The name Unpaku (雲伯) is constructed by extracting a representative kanji from Izumo (出雲) and Hōki (伯耆), the names of former provinces of this region.

The Umpaku dialects are:
 Izumo dialect (eastern Shimane Prefecture, formerly known as Izumo Province)
 Yonago dialect (western Tottori Prefecture centered on Yonago)
 Oki dialect (Oki islands of Shimane Prefecture)

Pronunciation 
Umpaku dialect, especially Izumo-ben, uniquely among dialects in the Chūgoku region, superficially resembles Tōhoku dialects in pronunciation and is thus also called Zūzū-ben. It has neutralization of the high vowels "i" and "u".

Vowels 
Voiceless vowel sounds are common in most western Japanese accents and this is no different in Izumo where they are commonly heard. 
In Izumo and western Hoki, just like the Tohoku dialects "i" and "u" sounds are centralized. "i" is commonly pronounced  and "u" .

Consonants

The dropping of "r" sounds 
In Izumo and western Hoki dialects, "r" sounds are often dropped and replaced with an elongation of the previous vowel. e.g. dare > daa "who", arimasu > aamasu "there is". In particular this often happens to "ri" and "ru" sounds which are almost all replaced by this elongated sound. In some areas, shiroi "white" becomes shie and akeru "to open" becomes akyae. In Oki, these sounds are also replaced by sokuon such as sono tsumodda (sono tsumori da).

Remnants of archaic sounds 
 kwa, gwa
 f instead of h
 In the Heian period, all of the "h" row of sounds were pronounced with an "f" sound  rather than with a "h" i.e. fa, fi, fu, fe, fo. Izumo still keeps this pronunciation. For example： fashi  = hashi "chopsticks", febi  = hebi "snake"
 se, ze
 In pronunciation "se" becomes "she" and "ze" becomes "je", similar to the Kyushu dialect.

Pitch Accent

Grammar

Vocabulary 
 kariru (かりる) "to borrow"; karu in other forms of western Japanese.
 dandan (ダンダン) "thank you"; arigatō in Standard Japanese. It is not used within the family, but rather in conversation with strangers, in much the same way as in Standard Japanese dōmo is used as an abbreviation.
 gosu (ごす) "to give (to speaker)"; kureru in Standard Japanese. E.g. X-san ga wa ni yasai o goita wa "Mr. X gave me vegetables." For a more polite form, goshinaru is also used。
 kyotoi (きょとい) "scary, frightening"; kowai in Standard Japanese. E.g. maa, ano hito wa kyotoi wa! "Oh, that person is scary!", aa! kyoto, kyoto! nigetoku da wa! "Oh, how scary he is! Let's escape!"
 chonboshi (ちょんぼし)/chokkoshi (ちょっこし) "a little"; sukoshi or chotto in Standard Japanese.
 gaina (がいな) "giant"; sugoi or gotsui in Standard Japanese. The animation studio Gainax is named for gaina.
 banjimashite (ばんじまして) "good evening"; konbanwa in Standard Japanese.

References

External links 
 正しい?出雲弁講座 

Japanese dialects